The Lebanese American University Immortals RLFC is a rugby league team that has been participating in Lebanese Rugby League Committee competitions since its first domestic championship in 2002. The Immortals are considered as ”the undisputed kings of Lebanese rugby league” having won five titles from 11 possible ones.

History

In 2001, RLIF sanctions the development plan for Lebanese rugby league. The RLIF send Mr. Danni Kazandjian as a development officer to Lebanon. After successive meeting with Lebanese American University Dean of Student’s Affairs and sports Coordinator the team got its funding and was established. The team started training for their first season with none other than Danni Kazandijian as their coach. The team was composed mainly of LAU students and some other university students.

The first two seasons for the Immortals were a true underdog story. In winter 2002, the Immortals lost their first three games in a row, then won their first game in Jamhour Stadium defeating the Lebanese Army rugby league team. The Immortals battled their way up where they tied points with UOB Razorbacks RLFC in the league standing, but they were able to gain a spot in the season Final due to goal difference. The Immortals lost the Winter 2002 Final to AUB Wolves RLFC.

The spring 2003 championship started in a better way than the previous season. The Immortals finished the season on top of the table standing with 14 points, winning seven games and losing two. The spring 2003 Final was a grudge game against their bitter rivals the Wolves where the Immortals won their first title by unexpectedly defeating the wolves 32–17 in a close game.

The team's most experienced player, Sami Halabi, who played Rugby Union for 10 years in Dubai before playing Rugby league, was asked to coach the team as a coach player in the 2003. The team had a good Season in which his second place in the league standing earned him a place in Season Final where he lost the final Game to the Wolves RLFC 12–18.

In the spring 2004 as in the previous spring championship, finished the season on top of the table. In the season final game, the Immortals RLFC defeated the wolves RLFC 34–22 to win their second spring championship in a row.

The winter 2004 championship turned to be a disaster for the Immortals: their third place in the standing denied them a place in the final game in which the Razorbacks RLFC were crowned for the first time as champions.

After the previous year upset, the Immortals RLFC played a great 2005 spring championship in which they won the Season final by in AUB.

The winter 2005 championship, the Immortals finished the season in second place just behind a Razorback RLFC team whose defensive line just conceived 38 points in 8 games. The final game held in Balamand Stadium, was as promised defensive game. The Immortals RLFC won the final game 10–8. (All four tries were scored in the first 20 minutes in the game). The Immortals became the first team in Lebanese Rugby League Championship to win both spring and winter championships.

As it became the unofficial tradition the Immortals RLFC couldn’t win both championship in a row finished their 2006 spring championship in second behind the Razorbacks. The Razorbacks won a well deserved final game in Balamand Stadium 36-14 to clinch their second Title. During the 2006 spring championship, the Immortals RLFC travelled to France to play in a seven’s tournament as part of the "Tournoi des 5 Ballons "organized by the ESEC University. The Immortals tied point with a Russian and French university but failed to play the final game by a mere try in tries difference. The Immortals took third place after beating a Spanish university in their last game. The Sami Halabi era came to an end due to the fact that Mr. Halabi was forced to travel, the Immortals RLFC appointed Both Ibrahim Ballout and the Lebanese Rugby League undoubtedly best player Rudy Hachach as team coaches. The Immortals had a perfect Season. They finished their season undefeated and won their final game against their bitter Rivals the Wolves RLFC in Bhamdoun 36–10. During this season, the Immortals set the Lebanese Rugby League championship winning margin record 82–0 against Club Libanais (now known as Jounieh Al Galacticos RLFC) on January 14, 2007 in Bhamdoun Stadium.

The spring 2007 had its ups and downs, but right after the Immortals RLFC returned on the right track the unfortunate “Nahr el Bared” Incidents forced an early end to the championship. The Lebanese Rugby League Committee declared the Galacticos RLFC as champions.

With the beginning of the 2008 the winter and spring championship were joined into a one 2007/2008 Bank of Beirut championship. The Immortals finished the Season top seeded but lost in the finals To the Jounieh Galacticos.

The second version of the 2008/2009 Bank of Beirut Championship also finished the Season with a first undefeated Season but also lost to Galacticos in the final in an epic game after they conceded four tries in the first but came back in the second half. The Immortals were leading until they lost in the last minute with a correct try disallowed and a controversial penalty.

The Immortals started their campaign for the Bank of Beirut championship by winning the First Wolves 9’s tournament; then as the previous season they finished the regular undefeated and they had to wait to play their arch-rivals in the final. The LAU immortals went to the lockers for the first time in their season trailing by one point but as predicted came back the second half and managed to win the game and clinch the title. One week Later the Immortals completed the Lebanese Rugby League Treble by winning the AUB 9’s 2010 Tournament.

The 2010/2011 went as smooth as the previous year, the immortals clinched their seventh title by finishing again undefeated on top of the league table and beating AUB red backs in a close final game 16–8. During their campaign the Immortals travelled to Czech Republic where they won also the RL 9’s tournament – Pardubice without losing any game and their half back Walid Yassine chosen as Tournament MVP.

Historical Standing

Colours

The Immortals first played with the French Tricolor jerseys (Blue, White and red) due to the lack of suitable rugby league clothing in Lebanon. The jerseys were donated by the French Rugby League Federation post the 2002 Mediterranean Cup. All these jerseys carried the number 13.
But due to its affiliation with the Lebanese American University, the Immortals adopted green and white as their official club colors in the following years.

Team logo
The logo represent the face of a fictional figure of an Immortal . The drawing was done by Raymond Finan. The date refers to the year the team was established in 2002. The number “XIII” refers to rugby league. The colors green and white are associated with the colors of the Lebanese American University. The oval shape of the logo refers to the shape of the Rugby League ball.

The final layout of the logo was finalized and approved in the end of the year 2008.

Honours

 Local Cups:
Lebanese Rugby League Spring Champions: 2003 - 2004 - 2005
Lebanese Rugby League Winter Champions: 2005 - 2006
Bank of Beirut Champions: 2009/2010 - 2010/2011
Wolves 9's Tournament: 2009
AUB 9's Tournament: 2010
 International Cups:
Tournoi des 5 Ballons 2006 - Paris: 3rd Place
RL 9’s tournament - Pardubice, Czech Republic: Champions
 Awards:
LAU Best Achievement Award: 2003 - 2004 - 2009 - 2010 - 2011

Squad

 Squad:
{| class="wikitable sortable" width="100%" style="font-size:75%"
|- bgcolor="#efefef"
|- bgcolor="#efefef"
!width=5%|No
!width=5%|Nat
!!width=41%|Player
!width=10%|Position
!width=10%| Height (m)
!width=10%|Weight (Kg)
!width=3%|Age
!width=19%|Previous Club
!width=7%|Years
|- bgcolor=#FFFFFF
|align=center|1
|align=center|
| Hazem Tawil*
|align=center| 
!width=10%|1.80
!width=10%|92
!width=10%|19
|align=center| Immortals RLFC
|align=center|3
|- bgcolor=#FFFFFF
|align=center|2
|align=center|
| Hassan Jammal
|align=center| 
!width=10%|1.72
!width=10%|64
!width=10%|20
|align=center| Immortals RLFC
|align=center|2
|- bgcolor=#FFFFFF
|align=center|3
|align=center|
|''Nabil Tawil|align=center| right-
!width=10%|1.79
!width=10%|84
!width=10%|22
|align=center| Immortals RLFC
|align=center|4
|- bgcolor=#FFFFFF
|align=center|4|align=center|
| George Rahal|align=center| left-
!width=10%|1.78
!width=10%|89
!width=10%|22
|align=center| Black Lions RUFC
|align=center|4
|- bgcolor=#FFFFFF
|align=center|5|align=center|
| Mazen Knio*
|align=center| 
!width=10%|1.92
!width=10%|94
!width=10%|34
|align=center| Immortals RLFC
|align=center| 12
|- bgcolor=#FFFFFF
|align=center|6|align=center|
| Karim Jammal*
|align=center| 
!width=10%|1.73
!width=10%|83
!width=10%|20
|align=center| Phoenicians RUFC
|align=center|2
|- bgcolor=#FFFFFF
|align=center|7|align=center|
| Jad El-Hashem*
|align=center| 
!width=10%|1.75
!width=10%|86
!width=10%|20
|align=center| Immortals RLFC
|align=center|2
|- bgcolor=#FFFFFF
|align=center|8|align=center|
| Rateb Shallah|align=center| 
!width=10%|1.86
!width=10%|111
!width=10%|22
|align=center| Immortals RLFC
|align=center|3
|- bgcolor=#FFFFFF
|align=center|9|align=center|
| Mounir Finan|align=center| 
!width=10%|1.74
!width=10%|98
!width=10%|21
|align=center| Immortals RLFC
|align=center|2
|- bgcolor=#FFFFFF
|align=center|10|align=center|
| Nayef Abi Said|align=center| 
!width=10%|1.85
!width=10%|118
!width=10%|28
|align=center| Immortals RLFC
|align=center|7
|- bgcolor=#FFFFFF
|align=center|11|align=center|
| Ray Finan|align=center| 
!width=10%|1.82
!width=10%|98
!width=10%|20
|align=center| Phoenicians RUFC
|align=center|3
|- bgcolor=#FFFFFF
|align=center|11|align=center|
| Rudy Hachache|align=center| 
!width=10%|1.85
!width=10%|117
!width=10%|29
|align=center| Immortals RLFC
|align=center|7
|- bgcolor=#FFFFFF
|align=center|12|align=center|
| Kahil Bejjani|align=center| 
!width=10%|1.81
!width=10%|88
!width=10%|25
|align=center| Wolves RLFC
|align=center|4
|- bgcolor=#FFFFFF
|align=center|13|align=center|
| Ibrahim Balout (C)|align=center| 
!width=10%|1.85
!width=10%|102
!width=10%|26
|align=center| Immortals RLFC
|align=center|3
|- bgcolor=#FFFFFF
|align=center|14|align=center|
| Freddy Beaini|align=center| 
!width=10%|1.77
!width=10%|74
!width=10%|24
|align=center| Immortals RLFC
|align=center|5
|- bgcolor=#FFFFFF
|align=center|15|align=center|
| Darwish Nahouzi|align=center| 
!width=10%|1.64
!width=10%|70
!width=10%|24
|align=center| Immortals RLFC
|align=center|2
|- bgcolor=#FFFFFF
|align=center|16|align=center|
| Ramez Ghandour*
|align=center| 
!width=10%|1.76
!width=10%|95
!width=10%|21
|align=center| --
|align=center|Rookie
|- bgcolor=#FFFFFF
|align=center|17|align=center|
| Hassan Shaheen|align=center| 
!width=10%|1.80
!width=10%|75
!width=10%|20
|align=center| Immortals RLFC
|align=center|2
|- bgcolor=#FFFFFF
|align=center|18|align=center|
| Ahmad Fadlalah|align=center| 
!width=10%|1.80
!width=10%|87
!width=10%|19
|align=center| Immortals RLFC
|align=center|2
|- bgcolor=#FFFFFF
|align=center|19|align=center|
| Shawkat El Ghazi|align=center| 
!width=10%|1.76
!width=10%|95
!width=10%|21
|align=center| --
|align=center|Rookie
|- bgcolor=#FFFFFF
|align=center|20|align=center|
| Kassem Abdo|align=center| 
!width=10%|1.75
!width=10%|82
!width=10%|20
|align=center| --
|align=center|Rookie
|- bgcolor=#FFFFFF
|align=center|21|align=center|
| Alaa Khashab|align=center| 
!width=10%|1.80
!width=10%|65
!width=10%|22
|align=center| --
|align=center|Rookie
|- bgcolor=#FFFFFF
|align=center|22|align=center|
| Hani Assi|align=center| 
!width=10%|1.82
!width=10%|94
!width=10%|25
|align=center| --
|align=center|Rookie
|- bgcolor=#FFFFFF
|align=center|23|align=center|
| Khalil Namro|align=center| 
!width=10%|1.88
!width=10%|94
!width=10%|20
|align=center| --
|align=center|Rookie
|- bgcolor=#FFFFFF
|align=center|24|align=center|
| Abed Hammoud|align=center| 
!width=10%|1.78
!width=10%|83
!width=10%|19
|align=center| --
|align=center|Rookie
|- bgcolor=#FFFFFF
|align=center|25|align=center|
| Yves Khoury|align=center| 
!width=10%|1.85
!width=10%|80
!width=10%|22
|align=center| Immortals RLFC
|align=center|2
|- bgcolor=#FFFFFF
|align=center|26|align=center|
| Kevin Haddad*
|align=center| 
!width=10%|1.75
!width=10%|83
!width=10%|21
|align=center| Immortals RLFC
|align=center|2
|- bgcolor=#FFFFFF
|align=center|27|align=center|
|Walid Yassine|align=center| 
!width=10%|1.87
!width=10%|75
!width=10%|18
|align=center| --
|align=center|Rookie
|- bgcolor=#FFFFFF
|align=center|28|align=center|
| Adam Itani|align=center| 
!width=10%|1.84
!width=10%|85
!width=10%|26
|align=center| --
|align=center|Rookie
|- bgcolor=#FFFFFF
|align=center|29|align=center|
| Omar Wehbe|align=center| 
!width=10%|1.81
!width=10%|86
!width=10%|22
|align=center| Immortals RLFC
|align=center|2
|}

 Staff As November 2008

Rivalries
The Immortals and their fans have developed rivalries with other clubs, particularly the AUB Wolves RLFC, since the beginning of the local competitions in 2002, when the two sides were the strongest in the competition. The Immortals won five championships and the Wolves only won two championships during the period of winter and spring championships, and faced one another in six Grand Finals.

Records

Player records
LRLC STATS 2002 - 2007 (10 Seasons)
 Top 10 scorers (regular season only)
 1. Rudy Hachache (LAU) 454 (111 tries, 5 goals)
 2. Sami Halabi (LAU) 328 (45 tries, 74 goals)
 4. Jawad Fakih (LAU) 230 (48 tries, 19 goals)
 8. Ibrahim Ballout (LAU) 138 (11 tries, 47 goals)
 Top 10 try scorers (regular season only)
 1. Rudy Hachache (LAU) 111
 2. Jawad Fakih (LAU) 48
 3.  45
 Top 10 goal scorers (regular season only – minimum 50 points)
 1. Sami Halabi (LAU) 148 (64%)
 3. Ibrahim Ballout (LAU) 94 (62%)
 5. Hamid Wazni (LAU) 78 (72%) (Played Only Two Consecutive Seasons)
 John Elias Award (The Lebanese Rugby League MVP Award):
 Jawad Fakih : Winter 2005
 Robin Hachach: 2008
Rudy Hachache : Spring 2004 - Winter 2006
 Sami Halabi : Spring 2003 - Spring 2005

Team records

 First team to win the Spring Championship
 First team to win both the Spring Championship and the Winter Championship
 Hold Both the Highest Scoring points in The Lebanese Championship
 LAU vs. CL 82-0 2006 Winter Championship
 LAU vs. NDU 76-0 2004 Spring Championship
 Finished The 2006 Winter Championship UNDEFEATED
 Most consecutive wins in a regular season:
 8 Games: Winter 2006 (The Game against NDU was cancelled)
 10 Games: 2008/2009 Season
 The Most Crowned Team in the Lebanese Rugby League Championships
 LAU Immortals RLFC : 5 Championships
 AUB Wolves RLFC: 2 Championships
 UOB Razorbacks RLFC: 2 Championships
 Jounieh Al Galacticos RLFC : 2 Championships
 Holds the record for the Most Finals Played: 9 Finals

Notable former players
      Karim "Stoly" Abdo (Prop)
                       Hazem el Ali       (Prop)
                          Omar Azar          (Hooker)
                         Maher Darwich      (Wing)
                         Bahig Demashkiye   (Scrum Half)
                         Jawad Fakih        (Full Back)
                         Salim Frem         (Center)
          Sami Halabi        (Hooker / Utility player)
                         Marwan Itany       (Stand off)
                          Raja Khoury        (Scrum Half)
                       Alex Marlow        (Stand Off)
                         Charbel Raad       (Second Row)
                         Hamid Wazni        (Full Back)
                          Hadi Yashrouti     (Half Back)
                         Abass Haidar       (Prop)
                         Freddy Baeini      (Center)
                        Hussein "Abo Ali" Sharafeddine      (Prop/Second Row)                                             
      Ali Sadek (Wing)

External links
 https://web.archive.org/web/20111004174128/http://www.immortalsrlfc.com/
 https://web.archive.org/web/20110202050535/http://lebrl.com/

Lebanese American University
University and college rugby league clubs
Rugby league in Lebanon
Rugby clubs established in 2002
2002 establishments in Lebanon